Tower Plaza is a high-rise condominium building in Ann Arbor, Michigan, located at 555 East William Street. The building was first proposed in 1965, and opened in 1969. It stands at 26 stories. It was designed in the international style of architecture, primarily using concrete and glass. Originally a residential apartment building, it was converted to individually-owned condominiums in 1987. Tower Plaza also has the most buttons of any elevator in Ann Arbor.

Tower Plaza is situated close to the University of Michigan, Ann Arbor campus, and is within  of U.S. Highway 12 (US 12, Michigan Avenue), US 23, and Interstate 94.

Description 
Tower Plaza is the tallest building in Ann Arbor, at 26 stories. The next-highest building is University Towers, 536 South Forest Avenue, at 18 stories. It presents a solid face on the west side, and a narrow column of windows in the center of the east side. The main entrance is on William Street.

The base of the tower itself features a small retail space facing Maynard Street, and an attached single-story retail space holds three storefronts.  

On a clear day, someone looking out from the highest floors can see the Renaissance Center in Detroit, about 40 miles away.

The building has multiple antennas on its roof, one of them being the transmitter for Cumulus Media-owned adult album alternative radio station WQKL.

History 
Tower Plaza was first proposed in 1965, amidst a period of growth in Ann Arbor. Its site on William Street is located between the University of Michigan's Central Campus and downtown Ann Arbor. Its developer, John C. "Jack" Stegeman, had completed the 11-story Maynard House across the street years earlier. His company, William Street Company, constructed, owned, and managed the building.

The initial proposal was met with backlash from City Council, prompting a debate about the character of downtown. Another component of the controversy was parking, which was not required by law at the time, but was proposed voluntarily by the developer. This voluntary proposal became a mandatory condition of the building's final occupancy permit. The building's design was not modified to add parking, and instead the developers of the building chose to underwrite an expansion of the nearby Maynard Street garage.

Construction began in 1966, and was completed in 1969, delayed by construction worker strikes in 1968.

The narrower east and west sides of the building, currently unadorned concrete, were the subject of various proposals in the 1970s. Following budget cuts during Tower Plaza's construction, the initial plans for marble sides were abandoned, and concrete substituted instead. A 1974 contest, in advance of the 1976 United States Bicentennial, awarded prizes of up to $500 to local artists for designs on the concrete sides, but the artwork selected was never applied to the building.

In 1987, the building's owners attempted to sell the buildling to an Ann Arbor-based company, PreMark Associates, which would then convert the building to condominiums. The deal with PreMark fell through, and the building owners instead engaged Triad Management Corporation for the same purpose. The successor to Triad Management continues to provide services to the Tower Plaza condominium association .

The original gray glass on the south side of the building, facing William Street, was replaced with new green glass in 2006. Similar green glass was installed on the north and east faces of the building in 2017.

References

External links 
 Google Maps location of Tower Plaza
 
 
 Ann Arbor Tower Plaza Condominium

Skyscrapers in Ann Arbor, Michigan
Apartment buildings in Michigan
Buildings and structures completed in 1969
Residential skyscrapers in Michigan